The Kwame Nkrumah Mausoleum and memorial park is located in downtown Accra, the capital of Ghana.

History 

It is dedicated to the prominent Ghanaian President Kwame Nkrumah. The memorial complex was dedicated in 1992, and is situated on the site of the former British colonial polo grounds in Accra. It is five acres in size. The mausoleum, designed by Don Arthur, houses the bodies of Kwame Nkrumah and his wife Fathia Nkrumah.

It is the spot where Nkrumah made the declaration of Ghana's independence. On the premises is a museum that has on display objects from various stages of his life. The building is meant to represent an upside down sword, which in Akan culture is a symbol of peace. The mausoleum is clad from top to bottom with Italian marble, with a black star at its apex to symbolize unity. The interior boasts marble flooring and a mini mastaba looking marble grave marker, surrounded by river-washed rocks. A skylight at the top in the mausoleum illuminates the grave. The mausoleum is surrounded by water, a symbol of life.

References

External links

 Kwame Nkrumah Memorial Park
 A video of the mausoleum on YouTube archived at Ghostarchive https://ghostarchive.org/varchive/Q_WfORtbW54

Buildings and structures in Accra
Monuments and memorials in Ghana
Kwame Nkrumah
Government buildings in Ghana